The Territoire de Belfort is a department in the Bourgogne-Franche-Comté region, eastern France. It had a population of 141,318 in 2019.

History
The administrative district Territoire de Belfort was created under the terms of the 1871 Treaty of Frankfurt. The German Empire annexed almost all of Alsace, but the French were able to negotiate retention of the Territoire de Belfort which thereby was separated from the rest of Alsace (where it had been part of the department of Haut-Rhin). There were three principal reasons for this exceptional treatment:

 The population in and around Belfort was French-speaking.
 Belfort had demonstrated heroic resistance, under Colonel Pierre Denfert-Rochereau, to the German invasion. Belfort's left-wing Catholic Deputy Émile Keller now conducted a similarly forceful political campaign in the National Assembly. He argued that ceding heroic Belfort to Germany after the war would be unthinkable.
 Since Belfort is situated in a relatively flat passage between the Vosges and Jura mountain ranges (known as the Belfort Gap), the Germans agreed to leave the city in France, because the Prussian military officers indicated that this strategy would give Germany a more defensible border.

France had recovered Alsace three years earlier, but the decision was taken not to reintegrate Belfort into its former department. There was talk of giving it a new departmental name, with suggestions that included "Savoureuse" (after the main river of the new department) or "Mont-Terrible" (the name of a former Napoleonic department embracing parts of Switzerland), but there was no consensus for a name change and the department continues to be known as the Territoire de Belfort.

When the regions of France were created, Belfort was not included in the region of Alsace, but the adjacent region of Franche-Comté, since January 2016 Bourgogne-Franche-Comté.

Geography
Geographers might contend that Belfort lies on the ridge that divides two regions of France, but before 1870 it was politically part of Alsace.  However, in terms of the political regions established in 1982, the Territoire de Belfort has found itself in the Franche-Comté rather than Alsace.

The department has an area of only 609 km2 (235 sq. miles), being the fifth smallest of France (after Paris and its suburbs Hauts-de-Seine, Seine-Saint-Denis, and Val-de-Marne). It is sightly smaller than Malta or the State of Rhode Island.

Principal towns

The most populous commune is Belfort, the prefecture. As of 2019, there are 4 communes with more than 5,000 inhabitants:

Economy
The median net income per household for the department in 2017 was €21,310. The averaged figure for the Territoire de Belfort masked relatively large disparities such as, in particular, that between Belfort itself at €17,920 and Bermont at €26,600.

Population and demography
In 2019 the department recorded a population of 141,318. Of these, slightly more than 46,000 live in the commune of Belfort itself.

Four principal phases can be identified in the population trends during the two centuries between 1801 and 2000.
 the period from 1800 to 1872 was marked by steady economic development and a relatively high birth rate.  However, the cholera epidemic which in 1851 arose from increasing urbanisation, along with a more general economic slow-down, reduced the rate of increase in the third quarter of the century.  Between 1803 and 1872 the recorded population increased from 37,558 to 56,781.
 after the loss to Germany of most of Alsace in 1871, the Belfort population was boosted by the arrival of large numbers of refugees from "Germanisation": the years between 1871 and 1914 saw the development of large factories, with the mechanical and textile sectors being prominent growth areas.  The population increase and the economic development were at their most intense in the Belfort conglomeration itself.  By 1911 the territoire's population figure stood at 101,392.
 in the years between 1914 and 1945 the economic narrative was dominated by two world wars and the period of stagnation that came between them.  Population declined, having slipped to 86,648 in 1946.
 after 1945 the region became a focus for industrial growth: population levels followed the same rising trend, to stand at 131,999 in 1982.   Nevertheless, as in many parts of France, from about 1980 it was clear that the economic crisis of the 1970s was having a lasting effect in slowing the pace of expansion.

Administration
Its departmental code is 90, and its prefecture (capital) is Belfort. There is a single arrondissement (Belfort), which is subdivided into 9 cantons and thence into 101 communes.

Politics

The president of the Departmental Council is Florian Bouquet, first elected in 2015.

Current National Assembly Representatives

Current Senate Representatives

Tourism

See also
 Communes of the Territoire de Belfort department
 Cantons of the Territoire de Belfort department
 Arrondissement of Belfort

References

External links

  Prefecture website
  Departmental council website
  Tourist Office website

 
1871 establishments in France
Departments of Bourgogne-Franche-Comté
States and territories established in 1871
States and territories established in 1922
1922 establishments in France